Halland Britton (18 February 1890 – 11 February 1975) was an English long-distance runner who finished sixth in the 10 km race at the 1924 Summer Olympics. He won the Amateur Athletic Association of England 10 miles title in 1921, 22 and 1924. Britton placed 11th at the 1921 International Cross Country Championships, winning a gold medal with the English team.

References

1890 births
1975 deaths
Sportspeople from Derby
English male long-distance runners
Olympic athletes of Great Britain
Athletes (track and field) at the 1924 Summer Olympics